Timbertop is a full-time boarding, co-educational campus of Geelong Grammar School located near Mansfield, Victoria, Australia.

Established in 1953, by then Headmaster James Darling, Timbertop is compulsory for all year-nine students attending Geelong Grammar School. As of 2017 approximately 240 boys and girls attend Timbertop, where they participate in a wide variety of physical activities including running, hiking, and skiing, as well as a normal academic routine. Additionally, students at Timbertop do not have access to devices such as computers, mobile phones, or digital cameras. Almost all communication from students to family and friends off campus is carried through letters.

History
In December 1951, Geelong Grammar School announced that it had an option on a piece of land near Mount Timbertop where they would conduct normal schooling combined with outdoor activities that would foster independence and initiative. The concept was the initiative of headmaster James Darling, who was inspired by the likes of Kurt Hahn and England's Outward Bound schools.

The Timbertop campus opened at the start of the 1953 school year with 40 students who would be building sheds, paths, roads and a plantation. The campus consists of 2000 acres with a frontage onto the Delatite River.

In 2009, the Timbertop Campus was forced to evacuate to the main Geelong Grammar School Campus at Corio due to severe bushfires close to the campus.

Curriculum

Academic Programme 
Timbertop has an academic programme much like other schools. For five days of every week, classes take place on the Timbertop campus. Students take part in compulsory "core" classes, such as English, Mathematics, Science, Australian Curriculum History, and Positive Education. Students must also choose electives from a list including German, French, Chinese, Japanese, Music, Physical Education, Elective History, Geography, Agriculture, and Art.

The school introduced Positive Education to Timbertop in 2009. It is a compulsory core subject.

Outdoors Programme 
Timbertop has an extensive Outdoors Programme which encompasses Hiking, Downhill Skiing, Cross Country Skiing, Rogaining and Camping.

Students begin with two training sessions at the start of the year, in which they are taught to use and clean "Trangias", pitch tents, and correctly use their hiking gear. They then complete other hikes to places such as Mt. Stirling, The Bluff, and Mt. Buller, to familiarise themselves with the area, and to build up to a 3 Day hike, where they choose the route and its difficulty themselves. The first "Solo" session also occurs, with students spending a day by themselves in a tent on the Timbertop Campus, where they reflect, and think about goals for the year, and future life.

In term 2, students take part in a Unit Hike, but most of the term is taken up with Community Service and School Service; . A second "Solo" also occurs.

In term 3, students participate in Downhill Skiing on Mt Buller, where they do lessons, and free skiing. The students also learn Cross Country Skiing on two unit based trips, on Mount Stirling, near GGS hut, and on the Bogong High Plains. At the end of the term, students take part in a unit based "Mystery Hike".

Term 4 is the culmination of the outdoors programme. Returning students participate in Option Hikes 1 and 2, which vary in difficulty depending on the choices of the hike groups. The last unit based outdoor trip is a Walk Canoe Raft, where units do some walking, canoeing, and rafting (or sledding) near William Hovell Dam. Hike Rogaine takes place towards the middle of the term. Students walk to Mt Stirling, then compete in a Rogaine on Mt Stirling. The Hiking year culminates in the Four and Six Day hikes, where students choose and design routes, and are given a large amount of autonomy in choosing where they go, distances walked, and food taken. Students then partake in their third and final "Solo". 

In 2018, the final Unit trip "Walk Canoe Raft" was replaced (indefinitely) with a third Option Hike.

In total, students camp for between 50 and 55 nights during the year.

Running Programme 
Running, and in particular trail running (given the rural and hilly location of the school) makes up a large part of the Timbertop Programme. Students run between two or three times a week depending on the term. The aim of the running programme is to build the resilience and fitness of the students, to prepare them for The Timbertop Marathon, and ultimately later life.

"Crossies" provide a base line for fitness, and are increased incrementally every Term. The term 1 crossie is about 3 kilometres long, eventually reaching about 5 kilometres by term 4. Crossies are run every week before or after school starts (depending on term).

"Long Runs" are longer than the other runs. The length of the runs increases every week, starting (at the start of term 1) at approximately 4 km, and ending (at the end of term 4) at around 23 km, the penultimate run before the Marathon. This run involves running up West Ridge to the summit of Mt Buller and back to the campus.
 
"Wildfire Crossies" are short runs done in terms 2 and 3, designed to build fitness through interval training.

The Timbertop Running Programme builds up to Marathon at the end of term 4, which varies in length depending on the decision of staff, and available tracks to run, but is generally 33km long. Whilst the Timbertop Marathon is much shorter than a standard marathon (42.195 kilometres) it takes place on rough tracks and with hilly terrain.

Hobbies Programme 
The Hobbies Programme takes place in Term 3, before ski days. Students select two hobbies from a list that includes activities including but not limited to Snowboarding, Fly Fishing, Horse Riding and Mountain Biking.

Structure

Units 

All students at Timbertop are placed in Units of 14-16 people. Boys Units are named A through to H, and Girls Units are named I through to P, making a total of 16 Units. There are both 'new' and 'old' units; 'old' units were constructed by students in the 50's through to the 70's while 'new' units have been slowly replacing the older buildings since 2009. As of 2021, Old Units include A, B, C, E, F, H, L, M, N and O, while New Units include D, G, I, J, K and P. Students sleep, clean, study, maintain, and live in their units for the year. Once a week, units perform a "Sunday inspection", which actually occur on a Tuesday despite the name. During the inspection, every part of the unit is cleaned to a high standard and inspected by the Unit's Head of Unit. Additionally, students perform two inspections per normal day to maintain cleanliness and hygiene in the Unit. The units are divided into two "Schools": A school and B school. The units that comprise the two schools vary by year, and as of 2021, A school is made up of A, D, E, F, I, J, K and O units, with B school being B, C, G, H, L, M, N and P units. The two schools are always completely separate classes, and elective subjects in one school take place whilst the other has core subjects. 
When old unit buildings are replaced with new buildings, they are simply converted for other functions instead of being demolished and rebuilt, with replacements built elsewhere (the notable exception is G unit, which was rebuilt). In fact, many classrooms on the 
Timbertop campus are former unit buildings which had been relocated into new buildings. 

As of 2020, the I unit nameplate has been reallocated to a new girl's unit which was built by the end of 2019. Previously there were 9 Boys Units and 7 Girls Units; A through I and J through P respectively. New units also have a 16-person capacity. This reallocation was done to increase capacity for girls while maintaining capacity for boys in the long-term, and to create a 50/50 split between genders in the school.

Assistants 
Timbertop offers a Gap year programme. Assistants, known as "gappies" help with tasks such as co-ordinating activities, organising skiing, helping around the farm, supervising hiking groups and assisting staff in classes, among many other things.

Notable people 
In 1966, King Charles III attended Timbertop for six months. The event was widely publicised. In 1973, the then Prince Charles said that his time at Timbertop was the most enjoyable part of his whole education.

In 1983, former UK Prime Minister, Boris Johnson, took a gap year as a teaching assistant at Timbertop.

In 1998, Missy Higgins attended Timbertop in M Unit, where she wrote the song All For Believing. In 2001, the song would win Triple J's "Unearthed" competition. She wrote the lyrics of this song into the inside of the roof of her Unit.

In the late 1980s, writer John Marsden worked at Timbertop as head of English. While there, he made the decision to write for teenagers, following his dissatisfaction with his students' apathy towards reading, or the observation that teenagers simply weren't reading any more. Marsden then wrote So Much to Tell You in only three weeks, and the book was published in 1987. The book sold record numbers and won numerous awards including "Book of the Year" as awarded by the Children's Book Council of Australia (CBCA).

References

Further reading 
 
 
 

1953 establishments in Australia
Boarding schools in Victoria (Australia)